Charles Edmund Hibbard  (March 15, 1844 – August 11, 1922) was an American lawyer, banker and politician who served as the Western Massachusetts District Attorney and as the first Mayor of Pittsfield, Massachusetts.

Early life and education
Hibbard was born on March 15, 1844 in Farmington Falls, Maine, he attended Phillips Andover and graduated from Amherst College in 1867.  After he graded from Amherst College Hibbard began his study of the law in the Woodstock, Vermont office of William Collamer. Hibbard later finished his course of legal study with William M. Rogers of Methuen, Massachusetts.

Family life
On February 2, 1870 Hibbard married Henrietta Hayden in her hometown of Montpelier, Vermont, they had three children, Charles Lovejoy Hibbard and Mary Page Hibbard,  and Frederic Walbridge Hibbard.

Business career

Legal career
Hibbard was admitted to the Massachusetts Bar on April 21, 1869 however he first worked as a lawyer in Tama, Iowa after about two years in Iowa Hibbard moved to Boston, and then in 1881 moved to Lee, Massachusetts, finally in 1887 he moved to Pittsfield, Massachusetts.

Banking
In addition to his work as a lawyer, Hibbard was also involved in banking, he served as a trustee of the Lee Savings Bank, and as the president of the Berkshire Loan and Trust.

Public service career

District Attorney
In 1884 Hubbard ran for the office of the District Attorney for the Western District (which consisted of Hampden and Berkshire Counties), he lost that election to Andrew J. Waterman.  In 1887 Hibbard ran once again for the District Attorney position this time he won defeating his opponent Judge James R. Dunbar, Hibbard was reelected three years later defeating William H. Brooks, Hibbard served a total of six years as District Attorney.

Mayor of Pittsfield
In 1890 Hibbard was elected the first mayor of Pittsfield, Massachusetts, serving a one-year term in 1891.

1917 Massachusetts Constitutional Convention
In 1916 the Massachusetts legislature and electorate approved a calling of a Constitutional Convention. Hibbard was elected as one of the representatives of the Massachusetts 1st First Congressional District to the Massachusetts Constitutional Convention of 1917.

Massachusetts Bar Association
Hibbard served as the president of the Massachusetts Bar Association in 1917.

Death
Hibbard died in his apartment in Pittsfield, Massachusetts on August 11, 1922.

Notes

1844 births
1922 deaths
Amherst College alumni
Members of the 1917 Massachusetts Constitutional Convention
Mayors of Pittsfield, Massachusetts
Massachusetts Democrats
Massachusetts lawyers
People from Farmington, Maine
American bankers
County district attorneys in Massachusetts
Phillips Academy alumni
19th-century American lawyers